David A. Harlock (born March 16, 1971) is a Canadian former professional ice hockey defenceman. He played collegiate hockey with the University of Michigan before being drafted 24th overall by the New Jersey Devils in the 1990 NHL Entry Draft. 

Internationally, Harlock has represented Team Canada at the 1994 Winter Olympics.

Biography
Harlock was born in Toronto, Ontario. As a youth, he played in the 1984 Quebec International Pee-Wee Hockey Tournament with the Toronto Red Wings minor ice hockey team.

Before being drafted, Harlock played for the University of Michigan. Selected by the New Jersey Devils in the 1990 NHL Entry Draft, Harlock played for the Toronto Maple Leafs, Washington Capitals, New York Islanders, and Atlanta Thrashers. He played a total of 212 regular season games, scoring 2 goals and 14 assists for 16 points, collecting 188 penalty minutes. He also competed for Team Canada in the 1994 Winter Olympics.

Career statistics

Regular season and playoffs

International

References

External links

David Harlock as Crescent High School

1971 births
Living people
Atlanta Thrashers players
Canadian ice hockey defencemen
Chicago Wolves players
Ice hockey people from Toronto
Ice hockey players at the 1994 Winter Olympics
Medalists at the 1994 Winter Olympics
Michigan Wolverines men's ice hockey players
New Jersey Devils draft picks
New York Islanders players
Olympic ice hockey players of Canada
Olympic medalists in ice hockey
Olympic silver medalists for Canada
Philadelphia Phantoms players
Portland Pirates players
St. John's Maple Leafs players
San Antonio Dragons players
Toronto Maple Leafs players
Washington Capitals players